X Factor is a Danish television music competition to find new singing talent. The seventh season premiered on January 3, 2014, on DR1 and ended on March 28. Eva Harlou replaced Signe Molde as host. Thomas Blachman returned for his sixth season as judge and was rejoined by Lina Rafn and Remee, reinstating the original judging panel from seasons 1 and 2. Rafn and Remee rejoined the judging panel as replacements for former judges, Ida Corr and Anne Linnet. Spin-off show Xtra Factor did not return.

Judges and hosts

After the sixth live show of the sixth season on March 15, 2013, Ida Corr was asked if she would return as a judge for another season and said that she did not know. On 17 June, it was reported that former judge Remee, who appeared in the first three seasons, was in talks with DR1 to return as a judge for season 7. On August 16, it was announced that Eva Harlou would replace Signe Molde as host for the seventh season. On 17 September, judge Anne Linnet revealed that Lina Rafn, who appeared in the first two seasons, and Remee would be re-joining Thomas Blachman for season 7. The following day, the judging panel was officially confirmed as Blachman, Rafn and Remee.

Selection process

Auditions
The live auditions were dropped and replaced by the room auditions last used in season 3. The auditions took place in Århus from September 24–26, 2013, and at DR Byen in Copenhagen from September 30 – October 2, 2013.

Superbootcamp
Superbootcamp took place at Vega. The 15-23s and Over 24s categories were changed to 15-22s and Over 23s. Remee received the Over 23s category, Rafn received the 14-23s and Blachman received the Groups.

Bootcamp
Remee took the Over 23s to his home and was assisted by Chief 1; Rafn took the 15-23s to Kødbyen with Glamboy P and Jonas Worup; and Blachman took the Groups to Rundetårn, with assistance from Lennart Ginman and Carsten Dahl.

The 6 eliminated acts were:
14-22s: Dannie, Hadiel
Over 23s: Chaimae, Tommy
Groups: Anne Sophie & Ida, Ása & Carsten

Contestants

Key:
 – Winner
 – Runner-up

Live shows
The live shows started on February 14, 2014, at DR Byen. The season 7 final was the first since season 2 to be held at DR Byen after being held in Parken from seasons 3-4 and Jyske Bank Boxen from seasons 5–6.

Results summary
Contestants' colour key:
{|
|-
| – Remee's contestants (Over 23s)
|-
| – Rafn's contestants (14-22s)
|-
| – Blachman's contestants (Groups)

|}

Live show details

Week 1 (February 14)
Theme: Signature

Judges' votes to eliminate
 Blachman: Pernille Nordtorp
 Remee: lickety-split
 Rafn: lickety-split

Week 2 (February 21)
 Theme: Danish hits
 Musical guest: Shaka Loveless ("Dengang du græd" og "2 mod verden")

Judges' votes to eliminate
 Blachman: Mathias Chrøis
 Remee: Fie Winther
 Rafn: Mathias Chrøis

Week 3 (February 28)
 Theme: Top 40 Hits

Judges' votes to eliminate
 Blachman: Henriette Haubjerg
 Remee: Fie Winther
 Rafn: Fie Winther

Week 4 (March 7)
 Theme: Eurovision hits

Judges' votes to eliminate
 Rafn: Pernille Nordtorp
 Blachman: Steffen Gilmartin
 Remee: Steffen Gilmartin

Week 5 (March 14)
 Theme: British beats

Judges' votes to eliminate
 Rafn: ManBand
 Blachman: Henriette Haubjerg
 Remee: ManBand

Week 6: Semi-final (March 21)
 Theme: Songs from the contestants birth years; winner song
 Musical guest: Chresten ("Hanging My Youth Out")

The semi-final did not feature a final showdown and instead the act with the fewest public votes, Pernille Nordtorp, was automatically eliminated.

Week 7 (28 March): Final
 Theme: Free choice; duet with guest artists; winner's single
 Group performances: "All Night" (all contestants) and "You're the Voice" (auditionees)
 Musical guests: Carpark North ("Renegade"), Medina ("Jalousi"), Christopher ("Crazy"), Quadron ("Favorite Star") and Kim Cesarion ("I Love This Life")

References

Season 07
2014 Danish television seasons
The X Factor seasons